The National Institute Against Discrimination, Xenophobia and Racism (INADI) is a state agency of the Government of Argentina (answerable to the Ministry of Justice and Human Rights) which is charged with receiving complaints and pursuing charges against citizens accused of acts of discrimination or hatred. Created in 1995 by Federal Law 24515, INADI is considered one of Argentina's National human rights institutions.

Purpose
Discrimination in Argentina is hard to see on the surface because the marginalized population is practically none visible in society making up only .5-1.5% of the Argentina population. This is strategic. The government of Argentina has taken remarkable leaps in the direction of eradication of racial discrimination throughout the last decade. However, it is notable that this is not going at an acceptable pace. This slow moving pace is to be contributed to the change in Argentina leadership in 1999 as well as Argentina's long time institutionalized racism. It is said that 97% of the Argentina population is white, although this statistic is hard to decipher because of the underwhelming amount of available information on indigenous and immigrant communities, despite the deferment of the census because of lack of funds in 2000, when the national census data has been collected in Argentina in the past there was use of the category of national origin rather than race in Argentina, leading to incorrectly counting Afro-Argentines and citizens of indigenous descent. 

The miscounting of the census leads to the opinion of many individuals that 97% of the population is white is an over exaggeration, however, it certainly depicts the view of the country: white. This is a change. That is what is important, the change in the racial diversity of Argentina.  This change is thought to be built by nineteenth century founders that made notable strides to make Argentina a white nation through several different policies aimed at eradicating ethnic minority populations, while concurrently supporting European immigration. The 1853 constitution is still predominantly referenced in politics today, and the predilection for European immigration is not hidden knowledge, it is not secret that Argentina favors white immigrants. Racial discrimination persists against indigenous peoples, immigrants, Afro-Argentines, mestizo Argentines, Jews and Arabs. The lack of census information provided by the government makes it very difficult to provide insight into indigenous peoples’ representation and participation in governmental and political affairs, and society at large. 

Indigenous peoples do carry constitutional recognition and formal protection of their rights to bilingual education, ownership of ancestral lands, and guaranteed participation in resource management. However, indigenous peoples do not get a say of their natural resources, they are taken over by government further re-enforcing negative power dynamics between citizen and government. Moreover, indigenous peoples are increasingly marginalized in society as their representation depletes, and the country increasingly does not count their human existence. Indigenous people, immigrants of color, must fight for conditions for basic survival, it is clear that they are not wanted in Argentina society and the government has no place for them. What is important to get from this is, this just did not happen. The eradication of indigenous people/people of color is institutionalized, and purposeful. This can be elucidated by the countries significant contribution to xenophobia: dislike of or prejudice against people from other countries. Governmental officials have used the increasing crime rates in cities to defend the exiling, and spreading thin of indigenous people and immigrants, defending they are the main cause of the crime despite statistics provided by the government proving differently. 

The National Institute against Discrimination, Xenophobia and Racism of Argentina is an agency whose main goal is to effectively combat all forms of discrimination, xenophobia, and racism within Argentina nationally and institute new protections, as well as consoling individual concerned citizens and working on education projects. Organizations such as national institute against discrimination, xenophobia, and racism is a stepping stone towards global equitability. All aspects of discrimination should be considered, specifically gender. Women in Argentina have higher rates of illiteracy, less access to money, less access to representation in court, therefore, elucidating how women of none white descent are at higher risk of oppression in Argentina then men.

Recent activities 
In partnership with civil society and other civil rights organizations in Argentina The national Institute against racism and xenophobia works towards resisting the oppressions of marginalized groups in Argentina including, but not limited to, indigenous peoples, immigrants, Afro-Argentines, mestizo Argentines, Jews and Arabs.  The national institute of discrimination, racism, and xenophobia could receive grievances from individual peoples or more generally the organization puts most of their efforts forward through education campaigns including audio-visual materials, brochures, and pamphlets. This organization is a resource offering accessibility to justice for thousands of citizens, simply providing representation and services either individual or large scale educational, these efforts makes real steps towards indigenous people receiving their proper representation in society.

Structure
INADI is led by a Board of Directors, chaired by a director. The chair and vice-chair are appointed to their positions for four-year terms by the Cabinet from a list of three candidates selected by the Congress; four of the directors are representatives of Ministries of the Interior, Foreign Affairs, International Trade and Worship, Justice and Human Rights and Education.

The other three directors are representatives of NGOs who have extensive experience in the struggle for human rights. The Advisory Council, which assists the Board of Directors, has ten members representing NGOs and reflects the diversity of the groups most affected by discrimination.

Since the resignation of former director Victoria Donda in December 2022, the INADI has been overseen by a federal interventor, presently Greta Pena.

References

External links
 

Anti-racist organizations
National human rights institutions
Government of Argentina
Human rights organisations based in Argentina
1995 establishments in Argentina